L'Écho de Paris was a daily newspaper in Paris from 1884 to 1944.

The paper's editorial stance was initially conservative and nationalistic, but it later became close to the French Social Party. Its writers included Octave Mirbeau, Henri de Kérillis, Georges Clemenceau, Henry Bordeaux, François Mitterrand, Jérôme Tharaud, and Jean Tharaud.  Its editors included Franc-Nohain. Abel Faivre provided illustrations for the publication.

The paper merged with Le Jour in 1933 and changed its name to Jour-Écho de Paris.

References

Footnotes

Sources
René de Livois, Histoire de la presse française, Éditions Spes, Lausanne ; Société française du livre, Paris, 1965.

External links
 Digitized copies of L'Écho de Paris from 1884 to 1938 in Gallica, the digital library of the BnF

1884 establishments in France
1944 establishments in France
Defunct newspapers published in France
Newspapers published in Paris
Newspapers established in 1884
Publications disestablished in 1944
Daily newspapers published in France